The Saharan languages are a small family of languages across parts of the eastern Sahara, extending from northwestern Darfur to southern Libya, north and central Chad, eastern Niger and northeastern Nigeria. Noted Saharan languages include Kanuri (4 million speakers, around Lake Chad in Chad, Nigeria, Niger, and Cameroon), Daza (330,000 speakers, Chad), Teda (49,000 speakers, northern Chad), and Zaghawa (170,000 speakers, eastern Chad and Darfur). They are a part of the proposed Nilo-Saharan family.

A comparative word list of the Saharan languages has been compiled by Václav Blažek (2007).

Internal classification

External classification
Roger Blench argues that the Saharan and Songhay languages form a Songhay-Saharan branch with each other within the wider Nilo-Saharan linguistic phylum.

Reconstruction
Cyffer (2020:385) gives the following Proto-Saharan reconstructions:

Comparative vocabulary
Sample basic vocabulary of Saharan languages from Blažek (2007):

Numerals
Comparison of numerals in individual languages:

References

 
Language families